Bill Lewis (born 1953) is an English Stuckist artist, poet, publisher and mythographer.

Bill or Billy Lewis may also refer to:

People 
Bill Lewis (center) (born 1963), American football player in the NFL
Bill Lewis (American football coach) (born 1941), American football coach with various college teams
Bill Lewis (baseball) (1904–1977), American baseball player
Billy Lewis (footballer, born 1864) (1864–1935), Welsh international footballer
Bill Lewis (footballer, born 1871) (1871–?), English footballer with Small Heath and Leicester Fosse
Bill Lewis (footballer, born 1874) (1874–1940), Australian rules footballer for Carlton
Bill Lewis (footballer, born 1909) (1909–1949), Australian rules footballer for North Melbourne
Bill Lewis (footballer, born 1921), footballer for Blackpool F.C. and Norwich City F.C.
Billy Lewis (footballer, born 1923) (1923–2013), Welsh footballer
 Billy Lewis (Scottish footballer) (1931–2015), Scottish footballer with Morton and Third Lanark 
Bill Lewis (Australian politician) (1916–1991), Victorian state politician

Characters 
Billy Lewis II, a character on U.S TV soap opera Guiding Light
Bill Lewis III, a character on U.S TV soap opera Guiding Light
Billy Lewis, a playable character from the video-game, Rage of the Dragons

See also
William Lewis (disambiguation)